Castratella is a genus of flowering plant belonging to the family Melastomataceae.

Its native range is Colombia and Venezuela.

Species:

Castratella piloselloides 
Castratella rosea

References

Melastomataceae
Melastomataceae genera
Taxa named by Charles Victor Naudin
Taxa described in 1850